The East Geelvink Bay or East Cenderawasih languages are a language family of a dozen Papuan languages along the eastern coast of Geelvink Bay in Indonesian Papua, which is also known as Sarera Bay or Cenderawasih.

Languages
The East Geelvink Bay languages are:
Turunggare, Burate
Barapasi
Bauzi–Demisa, Nisa-Anasi (Bapu)
Central
Sirami River: Kofei–Sauri, Tefaro
Woria
Of these, only Turunggare, Barapasi, and Bauzi are known well enough to demonstrate a relationship, though they are all lexically similar (> 60%). The unclassified Kehu language, spoken between Turunggare and Burate, may turn out to be East Geelvink Bay as well.

Bauzi is the best documented East Geelvink Bay language, but may or may not be representative of the Geelvink Bay family as a whole.

Classification
A relationship between Yawa, spoken on Yapen Island, and the East Geelvink Bay languages was tentatively proposed by C. L. Voorhoeve in 1975 in a proposal he called Geelvink Bay. The hypothesis was taken up by Stephen Wurm, who developed it as part of an initial attempt to classify the Papuan languages; however, the relationship would be a distant one, and later linguists such as Mark Donohue considered Yawa to be a language isolate.

Clouse (1997) removed the Lakes Plain languages of the upper Mamberamo River in the interior of Papua from Trans–New Guinea, where Würm had placed them, and by comparison with Bauzi and Demisa proposes them to be a sister family of the East Geelvink Bay languages. Basic vocabulary cognates that Clouse suggests to connect the two stocks include:

However, in his 2005 classification based on comparative evidence from pronouns, Malcolm Ross treats all three groups as separate families, with Yawa tentatively placed in an extended West Papuan family.

Typology
Verbal morphology in the East Geelvink Bay family is less complex than that of Tor-Kwerba languages, but is more complex than that of the Lakes Plain languages.

Pronouns
The pronouns Ross reconstructs for proto–East Geelvink Bay are,

{| class=wikitable
|-
| I || *e || we || *i
|-
| thou || *o || you || *u
|-
| s/he || *a || they || ?
|}

Basic vocabulary
Basic vocabulary of selected East Cenderawasih languages (Barapasi, Bauzi, Demisa, Tunggare) listed in Foley (2018):

{| 
|+ East Cenderawasih family basic vocabulary
! gloss !! Barapasi !! Bauzi !! Demisa !! Tunggare
|-
| ‘bird’ || de || bume || bijana || dinarate
|-
| ‘blood’ || nosi || vasɛa || nahabi || nahavei
|-
| ‘bone’ || para || fa || heta || ha
|-
| ‘eat’ || ai || æ ||  || ɣayo
|-
| ‘egg’ || moʔa || ɔɔ || mwa || ʔoʔo
|-
| ‘eye’ || aronua || faxo || halukwa || hanua
|-
| ‘fire’ || awa || vua || gwa || urehe
|-
| ‘give’ || wai || lɔ ||  || nore
|-
| ‘ground’ || deta || bake || bæi || baʔe
|-
| ‘hair’ || nawa || ohuta || ohutai || ohitaʔi
|-
| ‘head’ || osi || ohula || ohuda || ʔohaha
|-
| ‘I’ || emi || e || emdə || ei
|-
| ‘leg’ || naro || naɔ || naro || nal
|-
| ‘louse’ || woa || vɔa || yo || ʔua
|-
| ‘man’ || doro || dam || damateha || date
|-
| ‘name’ || here || ɛ ||  || ʔe
|-
| ‘one’ || orari || væmtɛa || natudüe || duaʔa
|-
| ‘see’ || ute || aa ||  || maʔai
|-
| ‘stone’ || aea || kɛ || ɛdu || hahia
|-
| ‘sun’ || wapao || ala || arɔ || au
|-
| ‘tooth’ || moru || mo || molu || mou
|-
| ‘tree’ || auma || uto ||  || uto-me
|-
| ‘two’ || apimi || bɛhæsu || utahu || amaite
|-
| ‘water’ || waro || vaɔ || wɔte || mana
|-
| ‘we’ || i-me || i ||  || i
|-
| ‘you (pl)’ || u-mi || u ||  || wi
|}

The following basic vocabulary words are from Clouse (1997) and Voorhoeve (1975), as cited in the Trans-New Guinea database:

{| class="wikitable sortable"
! gloss !! Bauzi !! Demisa !! Barapasi !! Tunggare
|-
! head
| dauha; ohula || ohuda || osi || ʔohaha
|-
! hair
| ohuta || ohutai || nəwa || ohitaʔi
|-
! ear
| dogoi || hema ||  || 
|-
! eye
| fako; faxo || halukwa || aronua || hanua
|-
! nose
| ɔmtɔ || omata ||  || 
|-
! tooth
| mõ ||  || moru || mou
|-
! tongue
| iso || itsa ||  || 
|-
! leg
| nabaː; nao || naɾo || naro || nal
|-
! louse
| vɔa; vwa || yo || woa || ʔua
|-
! dog
| vɛm; veme || nimi ||  || weme
|-
! pig
| doho; dɔhɔ || beiji ||  || doho
|-
! bird
| bume; bumɛ || bijana || de || dinarate
|-
! egg
| ʔo; ɔɔ || mwa || moʔa || ʔoʔo
|-
! blood
| vasɛa; veiso || nahabi || nosi || nahavei
|-
! bone
| fa; oveha || heta || para || ha
|-
! skin
| sogoba; sɔkɔba || hiɔ || terebaʔa || isaʔa
|-
! breast
| ahudɛ || ubɾa ||  || 
|-
! tree
| uto ||  || auma || uto-me
|-
! man
| data ||  || doro || date
|-
! sky
| asum || asunawa ||  || 
|-
! sun
| ala; ala(meoho) || aɾɔ || wapao || au
|-
! moon
| ala || aɾo ||  || 
|-
! water
| valo; vaɔ || wɔte || waro || mana
|-
! fire
| üwa; vua || gwa || awa || urehe
|-
! stone
| kɛ; khe || ɛdu || aea || hahia
|-
! name
| ɛ; ele ||  || here || ʔe
|-
! eat
| æ; udeʔa ||  || aire || ghayo
|-
! one
| væmtɛa; vamtia || natudüe || orari || duaʔa
|-
! two
| beasu; bɛhæsu || utahu || apimi || amaite
|}

See also
Papuan languages
Districts of Papua for a list of districts and villages with respective languages

References

External links
East Geelvink Bay languages database at TransNewGuinea.org

 
Languages of western New Guinea
Cenderawasih Bay
Language families
Papuan languages